Chytonix variegata is a moth of the family Noctuidae first described by Wileman in 1914. It is found in Taiwan.

References

Moths described in 1914
Hadeninae